Stanley Harwood McCuaig,  (February 11, 18911986), was a prominent Canadian lawyer in Edmonton, Alberta.

Early life and education
McCuaig was born at Bainsville, Ontario, the son of Duncan Donald McCuaig. He was educated at Williamstown, Ontario and then attended Queen's University at Kingston, Ontario, graduating with a degree of Bachelor of Arts in 1913. Following graduation, he moved west to Edmonton, Alberta, where he became a law student, articled to Alexander Rutherford, the former Premier of Alberta.

Military service
On April 20, 1917, at Lethbridge, Alberta McCuaig enlisted in the Canadian Army, joining the Canadian Field Artillery (78th Depot Battery) of the Royal Regiment of Canadian Artillery. He fought on the Western Front with the Canadian Corps and was awarded the Military Cross for conspicuous gallantry in action.

Marriage and family

After the war, McCuaig returned to Edmonton and resumed working with Rutherford. In 1919, McCuaig married Rutherford's daughter, Hazel Rutherford. Together, the couple had four children: two sons and two daughters.

McCuaig and his family were long-time members of First Presbyterian Church of Edmonton.

Law career
McCuaig practised with the Rutherford firm for many years, but, in 1939, he left to establish his own firm, McCuaig, Desrochers, Beckingham & McDonald, which continues today as McCuaig Desrochers LLP. In 1948, his son Eric McCuaig joined the firm. McCuaig practised law in Edmonton for almost 60 years, setting very high practice standards for himself and for the firm.

In 1949 and 1950, McCuaig was the president of the Canadian Bar Association, a voluntary professional association of lawyers across Canada. From 1952-53, he served as the President of the Law Society of Alberta, the regulatory body for lawyers in Alberta. Some twenty years later, his son Eric McCuaig was also elected President of the Law Society.

In 1949, Queen's University awarded him an honorary Doctor of Laws degree. The Dr. Stanley Harwood McCuaig Scholarship is awarded at Queen's Law School to students with high standing in courses in Property Law, Business Associations and Commercial Law.

References

Queen's University at Kingston alumni
Royal Regiment of Canadian Artillery personnel
Canadian recipients of the Military Cross
Lawyers in Alberta
Canadian King's Counsel
Canadian Bar Association Presidents
1891 births
1986 deaths
Canadian military personnel of World War I
Canadian Expeditionary Force soldiers
Canadian Army soldiers